Hardin Township is an inactive township in Clinton County, in the U.S. state of Missouri.

Hardin Township was erected in 1834, and most likely was named after Hardin County, Kentucky, the native home of a first settler.

References

Townships in Missouri
Townships in Clinton County, Missouri